Preferential entailment is a non-monotonic logic based on selecting only models that are considered the most plausible. The plausibility of models is expressed by an ordering among models called a preference relation, hence the name preference entailment.

Circumscription can be seen as the particular case of preferential entailment when the ordering is based on containment of the sets of variables assigned to true (in the propositional case) or containment of the extensions of predicates (in the first-order logic case).

See also

References

Logic in computer science
Knowledge representation
Non-classical logic